DTA Records (an initialism for "Don't Trust Anyone") is an American record label founded in December 2019 by Travis Barker, best known as the drummer of Blink-182. It is a joint partnership between Barker and Elektra Entertainment (a label group owned by Warner Music Group), which distributes the label's releases.

History

Formation (2019) 

DTA Records was founded in 2019 as a partnership between Travis Barker and Elektra Music Group (now known as Elektra Entertainment, following its merger into 300 Elektra Entertainment). The label was conceived after Johnny Minardi, an Atlantic Records employee and acquaintance of Barker, told Barker of Elektra Music Group's co-president Gregg Nadel's desire to start a new record label with Barker. Minardi offered Barker a deal which allowed him and Nadel to help develop new artists together. Barker was already well acquainted with Warner Music Group, with his old record label, LaSalle Records, formerly being distributed through Atlantic, and more recently, he had played drums for or produced albums for various artists associated with WMG's labels, such as Fever 333, grandson and Jasiah.

Barker's vision for DTA Records was to use the label to develop up and coming artists, and guarantee them greater security and freedoms on the label. "As an artist, it's important to me that an artist's vision is protected at all costs. It's crucial that I'm able to look an artist in the eye and believe it when I say we can take them from a basement to an arena." However, Barker is extremely selective about the artists he signs to DTA, stating; “It has to be someone I feel comfortable taking a picture with and co-signing, saying I believe in this person and I think that this person is going to change music or at least make a huge fucking dent in music. I just don’t want to sign some random person.” DTA Records, while also acting as a artist development label for Barker, also acts as a hub for Travis Barker and his collaborations with other artists.

The formation of DTA Records was announced on December 13, 2019. The same day, DTA released its first single, "Gimme Brain", a collaboration between Barker, Lil Wayne and Rick Ross.

jxdn, Avril Lavigne, Ho99o9 and continued growth (2020–present) 
In February 2020, Jxdn became the first signing to the DTA Records label, following the success of his debut single "Comatose". His first release on the label, the single "Angels & Demons" became a viral hit on TikTok and became DTA Records' first release to be certified Gold by the Recording Industry Association of America (RIAA), which it attained on July 2, 2021. His debut album, Tell Me About Tomorrow, was DTA's first studio album release, and reached number 95 on the Billboard 200 Chart.

On November 3, 2021, Canadian pop-punk singer Avril Lavigne announced she had signed to DTA Records. She released her first single for DTA, "Bite Me", on November 9, 2021. Lavigne released her first album through DTA, Love Sux, on February 25, 2022; it became DTA's first top-10 album on the Billboard 200 Chart, reaching number nine.

On January 20, 2022, the punk rock band Ho99o9 (pronounced Horror) released the single "Battery Not Included" through DTA; their first album since 2017's United States of Horror, titled SKIN, was produced by Travis Barker and released on March 11, 2022.

Roster
Current artists

 Avril Lavigne
 Travis Barker
 jxdn
 Ho99o9Past Artists
 Caspr

Discography

See also
 LaSalle Records, Travis Barker's first record label
 Travis Barker discography

References

External links
 

DTA Records
Elektra Records
American record labels
Record labels established in 2019
2019 establishments in the United States
Labels distributed by Warner Music Group
Warner Music labels